Machines of Our Disgrace is the fourth album by American industrial metal project Circle of Dust, released on December 9, 2016, through Klayton's own label, FiXT Music. The album is the first new material released under Circle of Dust since Disengage.

Background and release

In late 2015, Klayton reclaimed the rights to the Circle of Dust moniker, along with all original masters and demos, he announced plans to release remastered versions of all three albums, along with Metamorphosis and Misguided, and finally, a new album. On February 16, 2016, Klayton released the first song from the new album, "Contagion", as a free download.

From March 4, 2016, all five remasters were released, eight weeks apart, with Circle of Dust, Brainchild and Disengage all including songs from the upcoming album, due to be released in December that year. On October 28, Klayton finally announced that the new album, Machines of Our Disgrace, would be released on December 9, 2016.

Themes

The album serves as a critique of scientific and technological advancements, ranging from cyberpsychology ("Machines of Our Disgrace", "Contagion", "Hive Mind"), human enhancement ("alt_Human", "Neurachem") and social darwinism ("Humanarchy").

Track listing

Personnel

Circle of Dust
 Klayton – vocals, synthesizers, guitar, bass guitar, percussion, songwriting, production, mixing, editing, mastering, programming

Additional personnel
 Ninja Jo – artwork

Charts

References

2016 albums
Circle of Dust albums